Ahn Joon-soo (born 28 January 1998) is a South Korean football player. He plays as a goalkeeper for Busan IPark in the K League 2.

Career
Ahn Joon-soo joined Cerezo Osaka in 2016. On September 10, he debuted in J3 League (v Tochigi SC).

Club statistics
Updated to 27 December 2018.

Honours

International
South Korea U23
AFC U-23 Championship: 2020

References

External links
  
  
 
 
 

1998 births
Living people
South Korean footballers
J1 League players
J2 League players
J3 League players
Cerezo Osaka players
Cerezo Osaka U-23 players
Kagoshima United FC players
South Korea under-20 international footballers
Association football goalkeepers
Footballers at the 2020 Summer Olympics
Olympic footballers of South Korea
People from Uijeongbu
Sportspeople from Gyeonggi Province